MCL may refer to:

Medicine 
 Mantle cell lymphoma
 Mast cell leukemia
 Medial collateral ligament
 Medical Center Leeuwarden
 Microlitre (μL), or microliter
 Midclavicular line
 Mucocutaneous leishmaniasis
 Multiple cutaneous leiomyoma
 Myeloid cell leukemia sequence 1 (MCL1)

Companies and organizations 
 MCL Cafeterias, a chain of American cafeteria-style restaurants
 Mahanadi Coalfields Limited, a coal-producing company in India
 Marine Corps League
 Movement for Christian Liberation
 Malabar Cements Limited a cement company in Kerala
 Mysore Cements Limited a cement company

Law 
 Michigan Compiled Laws

Science, engineering and industry 
 Maximum Contaminant Level
 Maximum Coupling Loss
 Mid-Canada Line of early-warning radar stations

Computer Science and mathematics 
 1150 in Roman numerals
 Macintosh Common Lisp
 McLaughlin group (mathematics), a sporadic simple group
 Monte Carlo localization
 Multicollinearity

Sport